Bathytoma oldhami is a species of sea snail, a marine gastropod mollusc in the family Borsoniidae.

Distribution
This marine species occurs along Southern India.

References

oldhami